The Madagascar cuckooshrike (Ceblepyris cinereus), also known as the ashy cuckooshrike, is a species of bird in the family Campephagidae. The Comoros cuckooshrike (Ceblepyris cucullatus) is sometimes considered a distinct species.

It is found in Madagascar, and Mayotte.
Its natural habitats are subtropical or tropical dry forest and subtropical or tropical moist lowland forest.

References

Madagascar cuckooshrik
Birds of Madagascar
Birds of Mayotte
Madagascar cuckooshrik
Taxonomy articles created by Polbot